HD 16754 is a binary or triple-star system in the constellation Eridanus. It has the Bayer designation s Eridani; HD 16754 is the designation from the Henry Draper catalogue. The system is visible to the naked eye as a faint point of light with an apparent visual magnitude of +4.74. It is located at a distance of approximately 132 light years from the Sun based on parallax, and is drifting further away with a radial velocity of +18 km/s. The system is a member of the Columba association of co-moving stars.

This object was flagged as an astrometric binary based on proper motion measurements made from the Hipparcos spacecraft. Zuckerman et al. The astrometric companion to the primary remains unresolved.

The main component is an A-type main-sequence star with a stellar classification of A1 Vb. Based upon stellar models, it has an age estimated at 212 million years. Consistency with its membership in the Columba association suggests a much younger age of 30 million years. Earlier measurements showed a high projected rotational velocity of 168 km/s. However, Ammler-von Eiff and Reiners (2012) found a much lower velocity of 13 km/s.

The visible companion is a red dwarf star with a class in the range M2-5V.

References

A-type main-sequence stars
M-type main-sequence stars
Astrometric binaries
Triple star systems

Eridanus (constellation)
Eridani, s
Durchmusterung objects
016754
012413
0789